Crockett House may refer to:

in the United States (by state then city)
Judge Joseph Crockett House, Hopkinsville, Kentucky, listed on the National Register of Historic Places (NRHP) in Christian County
John Edward Crockett House, Mulberry, Kentucky, listed on the NRHP in Shelby County
Joseph Crockett House, Nicholasville, Kentucky, listed on the NRHP in Jessamine County
Knott Crockett House, Rockland, Maine, listed on the NRHP in Knox County 
Crockett House (Pocomoke City, Maryland), listed on the NRHP in Worcester County
John Crockett House, Stratham, New Hampshire, listed on the NRHP in Rockingham County
Andrew Crockett House, Brentwood, Tennessee, listed on the NRHP in Williamson County
Samuel Crockett House, Brentwood, Tennessee, listed on the NRHP in Williamson County
Crockett House (Logan, Utah), listed on the NRHP in Cache County
Crockett Springs Cottage, Piedmont, Virginia, listed on the NRHP in Montgomery County